True Blue Two is a compilation album by Australian country music artist John Williamson. The title is the second True Blue compilation following True Blue – The Very Best of John Williamson released in 1995. Similarly, Williamson released a book of the same title with the song background and lyrics.

True Blue Two was released in August 2003 and peaked at number 8 on the ARIA Charts and was certified gold

Track listing

Charts

Weekly charts

Year-end charts

Certifications

Release history

References

2003 compilation albums
John Williamson (singer) compilation albums
EMI Records compilation albums